Bullet voting, also known as single-shot voting and plump voting, is a voting tactic, usually in multiple-winner elections, where a voter is entitled to vote for more than one candidate, but instead votes for only one candidate.

A voter might do this because it is easier than evaluating all the candidates or as a form of tactical voting. Voters can use this tactic to maximize the chance that their favorite candidate will be elected while increasing the risk that other favored candidates will lose. A group of voters using this tactic consistently has a better chance of one favorite candidate being elected.

Election systems that satisfy the later-no-harm criterion discourage any value in bullet voting. These systems either do not ask for lower preferences (like plurality) or promise to ignore lower preferences unless all higher preferences are eliminated.

Some elections have tried to disallow bullet voting and require the casting of multiple votes because it can empower minority voters. Minority groups can defeat this requirement if they are allowed to run as many candidates as seats are being elected.

Single winner elections
Plurality voting only allows a single vote, so bullet voting is effectively mandatory. Voting for more than one candidate is called an overvote and will invalidate the ballot.

In contrast, approval voting allows voters to support as many candidates as they like, and bullet voting can be a strategy of a minority, just as in multiple-winner elections (see below). Such voting would be for their sincere favorite, so it would not result in the same pathologies seen in plurality voting, where voters are encouraged to bullet vote for a candidate who is not their favorite. Bucklin voting and Borda voting used ranked ballots, and both allow the possibility that a second choice could help defeat the first choice, so bullet voting might be used to prevent this. 

Instant-runoff voting and contingent vote allow full preferences to be expressed and lower preferences have no effect unless the higher ones have all been eliminated. Therefore, bullet voting has no tactical advantage in these cases: on the contrary, it can lead to a loss of influence if no ranking is expressed among the final two candidates.

Multiple winner elections

Multiple votes are often allowed in elections with more than one winner. Bullet voting can help a first choice be elected, depending on the system:

 Multiple non-transferable vote methods
 Approval voting used in a multi-winner election works the same way as Plurality-at-large but allows more votes than winners. This results in a body that is less representative than a body elected under a proportional voting method but would still have the same ideological center as the population. 100% bullet voting under Approval Voting in a multi-winner election is unlikely, as voters are incentivized to vote for acceptable moderates in addition to their favorite candidates to avoid being locked out of the election entirely. 
 Range voting is a generalization of Approval voting where voters can give gradations of support for each candidate. Here bullet voting refers to providing 100% support for one candidate and 0% for all other candidates, just like Approval bullet voting.
 Borda voting assign multiple votes based on ranked ballots, like three votes for the first, two for the second, and one for the third choice. This encourages minority voters to bullet vote (not using all the rankings). If voters are required to rank all the candidates, it further encourages voters to (insincerely) bury strongest rivals at the lowest rankings. 
 Plurality-at-large voting (Bloc-voting) allows up to N votes for elections with N winner elections. In this system, a voter who prefers a single candidate and is concerned his candidate will lose has a strong incentive to bullet vote to avoid a second choice helping to eliminate the first choice. A united majority of voters in plurality-at-large can control all the winners despite any strategic bullet voting by a united minority.
 Limited voting goes the opposite way as Approval, allowing fewer votes than winners. This reduces the ability of a united majority of voters to pick all the winners and gives more influence to minority voters who would bullet vote anyway.

One Vote Systems
 A single nontransferable vote limits everyone to one vote, effectively making bullet voting mandatory, minimizing the power of a majority of voters to pick all the winners, and can work well if there are only a few more candidates as winners.

 Cumulative voting allows up to N votes for N winner elections which can be distributed between multiple candidates or all given to one candidate. Effectively, this is one vote which can be fractionally divided among more than one candidate. This removes any penalty to bullet voters, who support a single candidate, and it enables the possibility of a united minority to elect at least one winner despite a united majority voting for all other candidates. 

 Instant runoff voting and Single transferable vote take away the incentive for bullet voting (leaving candidates unranked) entirely since lower rankings are only used if all higher choices are elected or eliminated. STV goes one step further than IRV, computing a threshold for electability, like 20% for four candidates, and when a candidate is elected, supporters get a surplus fraction of their vote transferred to their next choice. This increases the value of giving full preferences.

Burr Dilemma
The Burr Dilemma or chicken dilemma exists in an election of multiple votes where a set of voters prefer two candidates over all others, while at best, only one is likely to win. Both candidates are incentivized to publicly encourage voters to support the other candidate while privately encouraging some supporters to only vote for themselves. When taken too far, this strategy may cause too many defections from both candidates' support such that both lose, while avoiding defections prevents an effective choice between the two candidates. It is named after Aaron Burr in the U.S. Presidential election of 1800, by Professor Jack H. Nagel, where both Thomas Jefferson and Aaron Burr ran as Democratic-Republicans. The other name, "chicken dilemma", comes from the game of chicken.

References

Further reading
 Behind the Ballot Box: A Citizen's guide to voting systems, Douglas J Amy, 2000. 
 Mathematics and Democracy: Recent advances in Voting Systems and Collective choice, Bruno Simeone and Friedrich Pukelsheim Editors, 2006 

Voting